Charlene Fernetz (born March 23, 1960) is a Canadian former actress. She is known for her role as Malloy on Street Justice (1991–1993).

Life and career
Fernetz was born on a large farm in the middle of Saskatchewan, Canada and studied journalism at the British Columbia Institute of Technology; but in 1990 it was while doing regional theater in Portland, Oregon, that she caught the eye of a Manager from Los Angeles, and within months she was a guest on the Showtime series, Kurt Vonnegut's Monkey House.

Filmography
Mann & Machine (1996) as Yvonne Stepka
The Hat Squad (1992)
Street Justice (1991–1993) as Malloy
Made in America (1993) as Paula
Woman on the Ledge (1993) as Carol
Harmony Cats (1993) as Jane Pitkeithly
Heads (1993) as Betty Jo
The Mighty Jungle (1994) as Susan Winfield
Paris or Somewhere (1994) as Gwen
Kung Fu: The Legend Continues (1995)
Hawkeye (TV series) (1995) as Hester
Sabrina the Teenage Witch (1996) as Aunt Zelda
Diagnosis Murder (1997) as Susan Huckaby
Sabrina, the Teenage Witch (1997) as Gail Kippling
Alibi (1997) as Laura Hill
The Outer Limits (1997) as Corinne Virgil
Two (1997) as Jill O'Hara
Ricky 6 (2000) as Ann Cowen
Beyond Belief: Fact or Fiction (2000) as Mrs. Baker
Just Ask My Children (2001) as Reporter Terry
Seeking Fear (2005) as Trudy McCormick
Murder on the Yellow Brick Road (2005) as Rachel Dowd
Keyeye the Movie (2008) as Rachel Burk

References

External links

British Columbia Institute of Technology alumni
Living people
Canadian television actresses
Canadian film actresses
Actresses from Portland, Oregon
Actresses from Saskatchewan
1960 births
21st-century American women